This article lists the team squads of Men's Football at the 2008 Summer Olympics. Each nation had to submit a squad of 18 players, 15 of which had to be born on or after 1 January 1985, and 3 of which could have been older dispensation players, by 23 July 2008. A minimum of two goalkeepers (plus one optional dispensation goalkeeper) had to be included in the squad.

Group A

Argentina
The following is the Argentina squad in the men's football tournament of the 2008 Summer Olympics.

Head coach: Sergio Batista

* Over-aged player.
Notes

Australia
The following is the Australia squad in the men's football tournament of the 2008 Summer Olympics.

Head coach: Graham Arnold

* Over-aged player.
Notes

Ivory Coast
The following is the Ivory Coast squad in the men's football tournament of the 2008 Summer Olympics.

Head coach:  Gérard Gili

* Over-aged player.

Serbia
The following is the Serbia squad in the men's football tournament of the 2008 Summer Olympics.

Head coach: Miroslav Đukić

* Over-aged player.

Group B

Japan
The following is the Japan squad in the men's football tournament of the 2008 Summer Olympics.

Head coach: Yasuharu Sorimachi

* Over-aged player.

Netherlands
The following is the Netherlands squad in the men's football tournament of the 2008 Summer Olympics.

Head coach: Foppe de Haan

* Over-aged player.

Nigeria
The following is the Nigeria squad in the men's football tournament of the 2008 Summer Olympics.

Head coach: Samson Siasia

* Over-aged player.

United States
The following is the United States squad in the men's football tournament of the 2008 Summer Olympics.

Head coach:  Piotr Nowak

* Over-aged player.

Alternates
Dominic Cervi (goalkeeper)
Frankie Hejduk (defender)
Robbie Findley (forward)

Group C

Belgium
The following is the Belgium squad in the men's football tournament of the 2008 Summer Olympics.

Head coach: Jean-François de Sart

* Over-aged player.
Notes

Brazil
The following is the Brazil squad in the men's football tournament of the 2008 Summer Olympics.

Head coach: Dunga

* Over-aged player.

China
The following is the China squad in the men's football tournament of the 2008 Summer Olympics.

Head coach: Yin Tiesheng

* Over-aged player.
Notes

New Zealand
The following is the New Zealand squad in the men's football tournament of the 2008 Summer Olympics.

Head coach: Stu Jacobs

* Over-aged player.

Group D

Cameroon
The following is the Cameroon squad in the men's football tournament of the 2008 Summer Olympics.

Head coach: Martin Ndtoungou

* Over-aged player.
Notes

Honduras
The following is the Honduras squad in the men's football tournament of the 2008 Summer Olympics.

Head coach:  Gilberto Yearwood

* Over-aged player.
Notes

Italy
The following is the Italy squad in the men's football tournament of the 2008 Summer Olympics.

Head coach: Pierluigi Casiraghi

* Over-aged player.
Notes

South Korea
The following is the South Korea squad in the men's football tournament of the 2008 Summer Olympics.

Head coach: Park Sung-hwa

* Over-aged player.

References

2008 Summer Olympics Men's
Football at the 2008 Summer Olympics – Men's tournament